The India Human Development Survey (IHDS) 2005 is a nationally representative, multi-topic survey of 41,554 households in 1,503 villages and 971 urban neighborhoods across India. Two one-hour interviews in each household covered topics concerning health, education, employment, economic status, marriage, fertility, gender relations, and social capital. Children aged 8-11 completed short reading, writing, and arithmetic tests. Additional village, school, and medical facility interviews are also available.

A follow-up survey was conducted in 2012 that revisited over 40,000 of the same households as the 2005 survey. This makes the IHDS unique in India as a large-scale survey where results from two time periods can be directly compared.

This survey was designed by Professors Sonalde Desai and Reeve Vanneman from University of Maryland and researchers from the National Council of Applied Economic Research and funded by the National Institute of Health. Results from this survey are summarized in a book titled Human Development in India: Challenges for a Society in Transition, published in 2010 by the Oxford University Press.

References 
Full text available online.

Desai, Sonalde and Amaresh Dubey. 2011. "Caste in 21st Century India: Competing Narratives.” Economic and Political Weekly, 46(11): 40-49.

Desai, Sonalde. 2010. “The Other Half of the Demographic Dividend.” Economic and Political Weekly, 45(40): 12-14.

Desai, Sonalde and Lijuan Wu. 2010. “Structured Inequalities: Spatial Disparities in maternity Care in India,” Margin: A Journal of Applied Economics, 4(3): 293-320.

Desai, Sonalde and Lester Andrist. 2010. “Gender Scripts and Age at Marriage in India,” Demography. 47(3):667-687. Abstract

Desai, Sonalde. 2010. “Caste and Census: A Forward Looking Strategy.” Economic and Political Weekly, 45(9):10-13.

Desai, Sonalde, Cecily Adams and Amaresh Dubey. 2009. “Segmented Schooling: Inequalities in Primary Education. In Sukhdeo Thorat and Katherine Newman (Eds.) Blocked by Caste: Discrimination and Social Exclusion in Modern India. New Delhi: Oxford University Press.

Desai, Sonalde, Amaresh Dubey, Reeve Vanneman and Rukmini Banerji. 2009. “Private Schooling in India: A New Landscape,” India Policy Forum Vol. 5. Pp. 1-58, Bery, Suman, Barry Bosworth and Arvind Panagariya (Editors). New Delhi: Sage.

Desai, Sonalde and Manjistha Banerji. 2008. “Negotiated Identities: Male Migration and Left Behind Wives in India.” Journal of Population Research, 25(3):337-355.

Vanneman, Reeve and Amaresh Dubey. 2013. “Horizontal and Vertical Inequalities in India.” In Janet Gornick and Markus Jantti (eds.), Income Inequality: Economic Disparities and the Middle Class in Affluent Countries, Stanford CA: Stanford University Press.

Vikram, Kriti, Reeve Vanneman, and Sonalde Desai. 2012. “Linkages between Maternal Education and Childhood Immunization in India.” Social Science & Medicine 75(July): 331-339.

External links 
India Human Development Survey (IHDS) 2005
Stories from the Field
Demographics of India